Dream Girl is a 1977 Indian Hindi film, directed by Pramod Chakravorty. The movie stars Hema Malini, Ashok Kumar, Dharmendra and Prem Chopra. Hema Malini was promoted as the Dream Girl from her first film and that eventually led her to star in this film.

Plot
The story revolves around a young woman (Hema Malini), who plays five different characters in the film – Sapna, Padma, Champabai, Dream girl, and Rajkumari, to steal money in order to maintain a home for orphans.

Cast

 Ashok Kumar as Verma
 Dharmendra as Anupam Verma
 Hema Malini as Sapna/Padma/Champabai/Dream girl/Rajkumari
 Asrani as Chanda Mama
 Prem Chopra as Prem Verma
 Lalita Pawar as Daima
 Dina Pathak as Ratnabai
 Komilla Wirk as Radha
 Alka (actor) as Roopa
 Pinchoo Kapoor as Boss
 S. N. Banerjee as Munimjee
 D. K. Sapru as Sindhi Groom's Dad
 Praveen Paul as Birbal
 Padmini Kolhapure as Padmini (orphan)
Pallavi Joshi as Pallavi
Alankar as Alankar
Raju Shrestha as Raju (orphan)
Ramesh Deo as Dr. Kapoor
Seema Deo as Mrs. Kapoor

Music
The music of this movie was composed by music director duo Laxmikant–Pyarelal and ever versatile Anand Bakshi penned the lyrics.

The song "Dream Girl" sung by Kishore Kumar became an evergreen hit.

References

External links
 

1977 films
Films scored by Laxmikant–Pyarelal
1970s Hindi-language films
Films directed by Pramod Chakravorty